The Bougainville monarch (Monarcha erythrostictus) is a species of bird in the family Monarchidae. It is endemic to Solomon Islands.
Its natural habitats are subtropical or tropical moist lowland forests and subtropical or tropical moist montane forests.

Taxonomy and systematics
The Bougainville monarch was originally described in the genus Pomarea and some authorities have classified it as a subspecies of the chestnut-bellied monarch.

References

Bougainville monarch
Birds of Bougainville Island
Bougainville monarch
Taxonomy articles created by Polbot
Taxobox binomials not recognized by IUCN